Hastula anomala, the anomalous auger, is a species of sea snail, a marine gastropod mollusc in the family Terebridae, the auger snails.

Description
The length of the shell varies between 35 mm and 52 mm.

Distribution
This marine species occurs off Madagascar, the Philippines and Australia.

References

 Bratcher T. & Cernohorsky W.O. (1987). Living terebras of the world. A monograph of the recent Terebridae of the world. American Malacologists, Melbourne, Florida & Burlington, Massachusetts. 240pp
 Liu, J.Y. [Ruiyu] (ed.). (2008). Checklist of marine biota of China seas. China Science Press. 1267 pp.

External links
 Gastropods.com: Impages anomala
 Gray J.E. (1834). Enumeration of the species of Terebra, with characters of many hitherto undescribed. Proceedings of the Zoological Society of London. 2: 59–63
 Fedosov, A. E.; Malcolm, G.; Terryn, Y.; Gorson, J.; Modica, M. V.; Holford, M.; Puillandre, N. (2020). Phylogenetic classification of the family Terebridae (Neogastropoda: Conoidea). Journal of Molluscan Studies. 85(4): 359–388

Terebridae
Gastropods described in 1834